Ruzizi IV Hydroelectric Power Station, is a proposed hydro-power plant, with planned capacity installation of  when completed.

Location
The power station is located on Ruzizi River, straddling the common border between Rwanda and the Democratic Republic of the Congo (DC). Ruzizi IV, lies in proximity to three other hydroelectric power stations along River Ruzizi, namely Rizizi I, II and III.

Overview
This power station is the fourth in a cascade of power stations on the Ruzizi River, benefiting the countries of Burundi, DRC and Rwanda. The power stations include Ruzizi I (29.8 megawatts) and Ruzizi II (43.8 megawatts), both located northwest of Ruzizi III and both operational as of January 2020. Ruzizi III Hydroelectric Power Station is a 147 megawatts hydroelectricity power station under development since the early 2010s. The power generated from these power stations is shared equally between the three neighboring countries.

Funding
In January 2020, the African Development Bank approved a grant of €8 million towards the preparation of this project. This follows another grant of US$980,000 approved in late 2018 by the Partnership for Africa Development's Infrastructure Project Preparation Facility (NEPAD-IPPF), towards the same goal.

See also

References

External links
World Bank Announces US$1 Billion Pledge to Africa’s Great Lakes Region
Rwanda’s Ruzizi IV Hydro Power Project Gets 8 Million Euros From AfDB As of 13 January 2020.

Hydroelectric power stations in Rwanda
Proposed hydroelectric power stations
Western Province, Rwanda
Rusizi District
Proposed renewable energy power stations in Rwanda